Peshawar Zalmi (literally meaning "Peshawar's youth") is a Pakistani franchise Twenty20 cricket team which plays in the Pakistan Super League and represents Peshawar, the capital city of the Khyber Pakhtunkhwa province. The team is owned by Javed Afridi. Peshawar Zalmi was established in 2015 following the announcement of the inaugural Pakistan Super League (PSL) by the Pakistan Cricket Board (PCB). Babar Azam is the current captain and Daren Sammy is the current head coach of the team.

Kamran Akmal is the leading run-scorer for the side,
while Wahab Riaz is the leading wicket-taker.

Franchise history
On 3 December 2015, the Pakistan Cricket Board PCB unveiled the owners of five city-based franchises for the first season of the Pakistan Super League. The Peshawar franchise was sold to Javed Afridi for US$16 million for a time period of ten-years.

2016 season

Peshawar began their 2016 season well, winning their first two matches. After a loss to Quetta Gladiators the team went on to win six of their eight group stage matches and finished first in the points table, qualifying for the playoffs. The first playoff match was against Quetta in qualifier 1. The match came down to the last ball Quetta winning by one run, Peshawar scoring 132 runs  in reply to Quetta's 133 runs. As a result of their first-place position in the group table, Peshawar then went on to play Islamabad United in the second qualifier match. Peshawar also lost this match and were eliminated

2017 season

Peshawar traded Aamer Yamin for Sohaib Maqsood of Lahore Qalandars during the off-season. During the 2017 Pakistan Super League players draft they retained 10 players and signed eight, including Overseas players Shakib Al Hasan, Eoin Morgan, Chris Jordan and Alex Hales. Shakib and Tamim were not available for selection during the initial stage of tournament due to national duties as they were in India to play only test match. Later Alex Hales and Shakib Al Hasan were replaced with Tillakaratne Dilshan and Marlon Samuels and Mohammad Shahzad was replaced with Andre Fletcher while Tamim Iqbal was replaced with Samit Patel.

In their first game of PSL 2017, Peshawar Zalmi lost to the Islamabad United by 7 wickets. In their next game against Karachi Kings, Zalmi won by 7 wickets in pursuit of 120 runs. Eoin Morgan starred in the chase with an unbeaten innings of 80 runs off 57 balls. Following this the Zalmi were involved in a low-scoring thriller with the Lahore Qalandars that saw the former collapse in the chase of just 60 runs before getting over the line with 3 wickets to spare.

As the tournament moved to Sharjah, Zalmi's first game against Quetta Gladiators was abandoned after repeated showers and the two teams shared the points from the bout. Following this, against Islamabad United, the Zalmis lost a hard-fought game that went down to the last ball. After being put in to bat by United, Zalmi could only manage a below-par score of 137 runs and never really got going. But the team's bowlers bowled exceedingly well to make a contest out of it. In their final game of the Sharjah leg, the Zalmis continued their losing streak after being beaten by Karachi Kings in a thrilling contest. Setting up a target of 175 runs, the Kings had the Zalmis reduced to 69–6 before Shahid Afridi and Darren Sammy combined in a 70-runs partnership that almost won the game for the Zalmis. However, they couldn't see the game through as the Zalmis fell short by 9 runs.

With the tournament shifting back to Dubai, the Zalmis registered consecutive wins against Lahore Qalandars and Quetta Gladiators respectively. Against the Qalandars, the team put up a target of 167 runs and then successful defended it after inducing a batting collapse of 5 wickets for 6 runs from the opposition. In the end prevailing by 17 runs and securing a playoff spot. But with the Gladiators, the team suffered a batting collapse of their own. Chasing a below-par total of 129 runs, the Zalmis were at one time reduced to 52–6 before a vintage performance from Shahid Afridi, who scored 45 off 23 balls, ensured that his team won with 2 wickets left intact.
In the first playoffs (qualifier 1) they faced Gladiators at Sharjah it proved to be a replica of last year qualifier 1 where quetta clinched 1 run win over Zalmi. after sent into bat by Zalmi Quetta gave a huge target of 200 runs  thanks to Ahmed Shahzad for his 71 off 38 balls. In reply Zalmi had a poor start losing 2 early wickets for less than 10 runs, then came Mohammad Hafeez who started hitting Gladiators all over the stadium he with Dawid Malan put up a 100+ runs partnership. After Hafeez got out Shahid Afridi came looking in best six hitting form scoring 34 off just 17 balls shifting match in Zalmi's favour, but got out at wrong time and as a result Zalmi collapsed in the last over of the match. Left arm spinner for Quetta, Muhammad Nawaz was the bowler who didn't let Zalmi score 2 runs off last 3 balls hence, Gladiators progressed into the final and Zalmi into the qualifier 2 where they defeated Karachi Kings by 24 runs. Batting first Zalmi scored 181 runs for 3 wickets due to Kamran Akmal's brilliant 104 runs from 65 balls. Wahab Riaz and Chris Jordan 3-for took Zalmi into the final for the first time ever. Kamran was adjudged man of the match in the end.

In the final, Zalmis defeated Quetta Gladiators – the runners-up of the inaugural edition of the PSL, by 58 runs batting first. Zalmi's left-arm spinner Mohammad Asghar took 3 wickets for 16 runs. In the first innings, Gladiators' Rayad Emrit took 2 wickets in the 17th over, which left the score at 112 runs for 6 wickets but Darren Sammy clubbed 33 runs in the last two overs taking the Zalmis total to 148 runs.

2018 season

In the opening match of 2018 season, defending champions Zalmi suffered a loss against new entrants Multan Sultans by 7 wickets. The next game, Zalmi secured a comfortable 34-runs win over Islamabad United. Defending a target of 176 runs, Zalmi's debuting fast bowler, Umaid Asif, was the star performer as he reduced the opposition to 25-4 inside the powerplay. Continuing on, the team suffered a loss against Karachi Kings in a closely fought game. Batting first, the Zalmis lost wickets with regular consistency. Only Dwayne Smith's unbeaten innings of 71 runs got them to a respectable total of 131 runs. Defending it, they took the game to the last three balls before the Kings prevailed by 5 wickets.

As the tournament shifted to Sharjah, the team won a thriller against rivals Quetta Gladiators. Batting first, the Gladiators set a target of 143 runs in a batting display that was punctuated with starts and stops on a two-paced pitch. In reply, the Zalmis were on course for victory at 107-2 before losing three quick wickets to end up requiring 22 runs from the last two overs. At this point, an injured Darren Sammy single-handedly won the match for his team by striking 16 runs from 4 balls to finish the game with 2 balls to go. The following game, the Zalmis beat Lahore Qalandars comfortably in the chase of a low target of 101 runs. The margin of the win was 10 wickets - the first such instance in the history of the PSL. Additionally, this was the first game for Zalmi's main pacer, Hasan Ali this season as he had been sidelined due to an injury.

In the final, Peshawar Zalmi lost to Islamabad United by three wickets. Peshawar Zalmi won the toss and elected to bat first. Peshawar's in-form batsman Kamran Akmal was out lbw for 1 run off 8 balls, with Samit Patel taking the wicket in the third over early on. Chris Jordan and Liam Dawson were involved in a fourth-wicket fifty-partnership. Later, Wahab Riaz's 28 runs off 14 balls ensured their side reached to a total of 148 runs. Islamabad's Luke Ronchi hit five sixes in the first five overs as he raced to 45 runs off just 15 balls, before he got out in the ninth over after scoring a 26-ball 52, batting second. But a sudden collapse resulted in Islamabad losing six wickets for 20 runs leaving them at 116/6. Akmal then dropped a catch at fine leg when Asif Ali attempted a pull shot off Umaid Asif with Islamabad needing 30 runs off 33 balls. Asif Ali then hit three sixes on the trot off Hasan Ali. Islamabad's Faheem Ashraf hooked Wahab Riaz for six with just one run required in the 17th over.

2019 season

Peshawar Zalmi finished the group stage with first position by winning seven of their matches and  losing only three. Peshawar came on top because of the higher run rate. Peshawar Zalmi lost to Quetta Gladiators in the qualifier by 10 runs.

In the final in Karachi, Peshawar Zalmi lost to Gladiators by 8 wickets becoming the runners up.

2020 season

In January before the season started, they signed Hashim Amla as batting mentor of the team, replacing Younis Khan for the job.

2021 season

2022 season

2023 season

Team identity
On 13 December 2015 Javed Afridi owner of the team revealed the team name and the official logo of the team in Army Public School Peshawar. The word Zalmi is a Pashto language word meaning youth.
The logo of the team is a fusion of a traditional Peshawari turban with cricket stumps. The logo has three, shades blue, yellow and white, signifying the pride of the region, the skies and the energy of the people.

The team's kit colours were yellow and blue, but are now yellow & black as they changed the kit in PSL 4. 
Peshawar Zalmi is Pakistan's biggest sports entity valued at US$40.5 Million according to NIelsen. Peshawar Zalmi has managed to retain most of its partners in PSL 4. The list of national and multi-national partners of Peshawar Zalmi include Haier, TCL, Sprite, McDonald's, JW Forland, Ruba Digital & Storm Fiber. The media partners of Zalmi include Urdu News, HUM Network, Dawn News, AVT Khyber News, FM 91, Daily Pakistan.

Actor Hamza Ali Abbasi and actress Humaima Malick were team's star ambassadors for the 2016 and 2017 seasons. In 2018 season, Mahira Khan joined Hamza as team's ambassadors after she replaced Humaima Malik. For the 2019 season, actress Sana Javed was announced as the team's goodwill ambassador. Gul Panra is Peshawar Zalmi's Regional Brand Ambassador from PSL 4 and also sang the Peshawar Zalmi Pashto Anthem for Zalmi.

Several musical anthems have been made for the team, and were released by Beyond Records.

Philanthropy - Zalmi Foundation - CSR Wing

Zalmi Foundation (ZF) is a non-profit organization, established in April 2016, with the mission to “Bring Back Smiles” by supporting and facilitating the implementation of sustainable development agenda across Pakistan in short, medium and long run. The foundation was established as a result of realization among the associates of Peshawar Zalmi – a Pakistani franchise T20 cricket team - that developmental challenges of Pakistan can be addressed through systematic and collaborative efforts from diverse stakeholders such as private sector, state institutions and civil society. With primary support from Cooperate Social Responsibility funds along with collaboration with diverse stakeholders, the ZF aims to help achieve sustainable development across the globe.

As majority of the development challenges require interdisciplinary solutions, we are committed to undertake impactful programme/projects that specifically aim to harness the synergies amongst various developmental themes. Our scope of activities involves research, implementation and advocacy regarding sustainable development themes including but not limited to youth development, women empowerment, education, health, social activism, peace and security, inclusive economic growth and international trade.

As its name suggests and having rich expertise in bringing social cohesion amongst all races through sports activities, we take pride in promoting sports and bringing peace by educating the youth of the affected areas by the harsh dials of the times.

Over the years, Zalmi Foundations has completed numerous successful projects along the lines of its key impact areas which include but not limited to education, women empowerment, sports, health, tourism and responsible citizenship. 

In 2017, Peshawar Zalmi joined hands with International Rescue Committee to raise awareness of education in Pakistan. The franchise is also actively involved in Pakistan in giving sports education to children through sports camps and training all across Pakistan. The team has largely contributed in charity works 
and as for 2017 SKMH are team's official charity. In 2016 they invited Army Public School attack survivors to watch PSL Live from the stands. Around 150 students and staff members from the school were invited to attend the inauguration ceremony of the first edition of PSL. In 2017, they took cancer patients of the SKMH for free to Dubai and gave the children a once-in-a-lifetime opportunity to fly out of the country and make beautiful memories together. Eoin Morgan member of 2017 squad donated Zalmi's Kit which he wore during the course of 2017 season to cancer patients of Shoukat Khanum Memorial Hospital. In 2018, team owner Javed Afridi invited 13 young patients under treatment at SKMH to watch team's matches live from ground.

In April 2019, Zalmi Foundation partnered with the U.S. consulate in Lahore to jointly work for vulnerable  girls of KP and Punjab to boost up their capacity building and make them empower through sports. And has recently  taken a Girls Cricket Camp Initiative with U.S. Consulate Lahore, which is focusing on sharing the importance of  sports involvement in the lives of vulnerable young girls from high school aged between 13 – 16 years, and aims to  increase the number of women and girls involved in sports in Pakistan. We aim to increase sports participation for  vulnerable young girls from high school, as ZF believes by taking such initiatives for Women and young girls, we can  make them enable to acquire new professional networks, develop a sense of identity and access new opportunities to become more engaged in school and community life. In addition, sports serve as a vehicle to improve women’s and  girls’ leadership roles and participation in decision-making and help to convene people across borders, cultures and  belief systems. They can promote greater tolerance and understanding among individuals and communities and can  challenge gender stereotypes and discriminatory attitudes.

During the Covid-19 Pandemic, Zalmi Foundation continued its fight against the deadly Coronavirus. Donation of PKR 10 Million was made to Prime Minister Imran Khan’s Corona Relief Fund. Javed Afridi, Chairman Peshawar Zalmi, presented the cheque to Prime Minister Imran Khan at Prime Minister House Islamabad. Two hundred thousand surgical masks were handed over to the government of Pakistan. Prime Minister Imran Khan praised the Zalmi Foundation and Javed Afridi's efforts to help the needy in these difficult times. He added that we can only succeed against the Corona virus if all of us stand together. Moreover, Zalmi Foundation developed and delivered a Ration Distribution Drive in remote areas of Bara and Khyber Agency. Zalmi Foundation distributed rations to the needy people in KP. Javed Afridi, Chairman Peshawar Zalmi and Zalmi Foundation, said efforts are being made to provide the essential supplies at the door steps of the needy during the lockdown situation due to Corona Virus Pandemic. The Ration Drive then continued in Tirah Valley. More than 36,000 families were provided with necessary food items. In addition, Zalmi Foundation donated 50,000 masks as well as medical gear to the Afghanistan Government in order to help Pakistan’s neighboring country fight against the virus. Haier Pakistan CEO and Zalmi Foundation Chairman, Mr. Javed Afridi said that Corona Pandemic has severely affected economies worldwide. Our neighboring country Afghanistan suffers from the same fate as the world is facing. Mr. Javed Afridi added that this is a combine effort of Haier Pakistan and Zalmi Foundation to help people across the border who are going through a very challenging time.

International representation

Sponsorship 
Turkish Airlines signed a deal to become the official airline sponsor of the franchise for Pakistan Super League 6 starting February 20, 2021.

Peshawar Zalmi 
Peshawar Zalmi is the biggest sports entity in Pakistan valued at more than $40 million as of 2019. It is the number one brand of the PSL since the past 3 years.

Global Zalmi 
Global Zalmi comprises the International Sports Branches of Peshawar Zalmi spread across 25 countries. Each year the teams from these countries come and play the Global Zalmi League.

Current squad

Management and coaching staff

Captains

Source: ESPNcricinfo, Last updated: 24 February 2022

Result summary

Overall result in PSL

 Tie+W and Tie+L indicates matches tied and then won or Lost in a tiebreaker such as a bowlout or one-over-eliminator ("Super Over")
 The result percentage excludes no results and counts ties (irrespective of a tiebreaker) as half a win.
Source: ESPNcricinfo, Last updated: 24 February 2022

Head-to-head record

Source: ESPNcricinfo, Last updated: 30 January 2022

Statistics

Most runs 

Source: ESPNcricinfo, Last updated: 24 January 2022

Most wickets 

Source: ESPNcricinfo, Last Updated: 24 January 2022

See also
 List of Pakistan Super League anthems

References

External links
 

 
Sport in Peshawar
Cricket clubs established in 2016
Sports clubs in Pakistan
Cricket in Peshawar